Valdemar Møller  (19 January 1885 – 16 February 1947) was a Danish actor and film director.

He starred at the Royal Danish Theatre between 1903–1905 and appeared in several silent films in the early 1910s. However, he only actively featured in films from the late 1930s. Møller was the brother of Danish actress Petrine Sonne.

Selected filmography
Balletdanserinden – 1911
Tango – 1933
Champagnegaloppen – 1938
Kongen bød – 1938
Cirkus – 1939
Sørensen og Rasmussen – 1940
Alle går rundt og forelsker sig – 1941
En søndag på Amager – 1941
Tag til Rønneby Kro – 1941
Thummelumsen – 1941
Alle mand på dæk – 1942
Tordenskjold går i land – 1942
Forellen – 1942
Alt for karrieren – 1943
Drama på slottet – 1943
Når man kun er ung – 1943
De tre skolekammerater – 1944
Spurve under taget – 1944
To som elsker hinanden – 1944

External links

Biography at the Danish Film Institute (Danish)

Danish male film actors
Danish male silent film actors
20th-century Danish male actors
Male actors from Copenhagen
Danish male stage actors
1885 births
1947 deaths